Damnation of Regiomontum is the debut album by Russian symphonic black metal band Tvangeste. It was released on 13 January 2000 via now-defunct Norwegian record label Valgarder, that was owned by Ásmegin member and multi-instrumentalist Marius Glenn Olaussen. Regiomontum (also Regiomonti or Mons Regius) was the Latin-language name for the now-demolished Königsberg Castle.

The track "Thinking..." was previously featured on their homonymous 1998 demo.

A music video was made for the track "From Nameless Oracle".

As with Firestorm, it is available for free download on Tvangeste's official website.

Track listing

Personnel
 Tvangeste
 Mikhail "Miron" Chirva — vocals, guitar, orchestral arrangements
 Vano Mayorov — bass
 Viktoria Kulbachnaya — keyboards
 Nikolay "Kok" Kazmin — guitar

 Session musicians
 Olaa — female vocals
 Anna — cello, violin

References

External links
 Tvangeste's official website
 Damnation of Regiomontum at Encyclopaedia Metallum

2000 debut albums
Tvangeste albums
Albums free for download by copyright owner